Tutton's salts are a family of salts with the formula M2M'(SO4)2(H2O)6 (sulfates) or M2M'(SeO4)2(H2O)6 (selenates). These materials are double salts, which means that they contain two different cations, M+ and M'2+ crystallized in the same regular ionic lattice. The univalent cation can be potassium, rubidium, cesium, ammonium (NH4), deuterated ammonium (ND4) or thallium.  Sodium or lithium ions are too small. The divalent cation can be magnesium, vanadium, chromium, manganese, iron, cobalt, nickel, copper, zinc or cadmium.  In addition to sulfate and selenate, the divalent anion can be chromate (CrO42−), tetrafluoroberyllate (BeF42−), hydrogenphosphate (HPO42−) or monofluorophosphate (PO3F2−). Tutton's salts crystallize in the monoclinic space group P21/a.  The robustness is the result of the complementary hydrogen-bonding between the tetrahedral anions and cations as well their interactions with the metal aquo complex [M(H2O)6]2+.

Examples and related compounds
Perhaps the best-known is Mohr's salt, ferrous ammonium sulfate (NH4)2Fe(SO4)2.(H2O)6). Other examples include the vanadous Tutton salt (NH4)2V(SO4)2(H2O)6 and the chromous Tutton salt (NH4)2Cr(SO4)2(H2O)6.  In solids and solutions, the M'2+ ion exists as a metal aquo complex [M'(H2O)6]2+.

Related to the Tutton's salts are the alums, which are also double salts but with the formula MM'(SO4)2(H2O)12. The Tutton's salts were once termed "false alums".

History
Tutton salts are sometimes called Schönites after the naturally occurring mineral called Schönite (K2Mg(SO4)2(H2O)6). They are named for Alfred Edwin Howard Tutton, who identified  and characterised a large range of these salts around 1900. Such salts were of historical importance because they were obtainable in high purity and served as reliable reagents and spectroscopic standards.

Table of salts

Organic salts
Some organic bases can also form salts that crystallise like Tutton's salts.

References

Sulfates